Grove City is the name of several places in the United States of America:

 Grove City, Florida
 Grove City, Illinois
 Grove City, Minnesota
 Grove City, Ohio
 Grove City, Pennsylvania
 Grove City College